Road work may refer to:

 Roadworks, when part of a road has to be occupied for work relating to the road
 Roadwork, a novel by Stephen King published in 1981
 Roadwork (album), a 1972 live album by Edgar Winter and his band White Trash
 Endurance training in the culture of fighting sports, especially boxing